The final of the Women's 4x100m Medley Relay event at the European LC Championships 1997 was held on Sunday 24 August 1997 in Seville, Spain.

Results

Qualifying heats

See also
1996 Women's Olympic Games 4x100m Medley Relay
1997 Women's World Championships (SC) 4x100m Medley

References
 scmsom results
 La Gazzetta Archivio

R